Al-Muzaffar Ahmad (27 May 1419 – 1430) was the son of Shaykh al-Mahmudi, and a Mamluk sultan of Egypt from 13 January to 29 August 1421.

References

Burji sultans
15th-century Mamluk sultans
1419 births
1430 deaths